The 2014–15 season was AS Monaco FC's second season back in Ligue 1 since promotion from Ligue 2 in 2013. They participated in the Ligue 1, the UEFA Champions League, the Coupe de France, and the Coupe de la Ligue.

Squad
As of 21 January 2015.

Out on loan

Transfers

Summer

In:

Out:

Winter

In:

Out:

Competitions

Ligue 1

League table

Results summary

Results by round

Matches

Coupe de la Ligue

Coupe de France

UEFA Champions League

Group stage

Knockout phase

Round of 16

Quarter-finals

Statistics

Appearances and goals

|-
! colspan="14" style="background:#dcdcdc; text-align:center"| Players transferred out during the season

|}

Goal scorers

Disciplinary record

References

External links

AS Monaco FC seasons
Monaco
Monaco
AS Monaco
AS Monaco